Tony Llewellyn is an Australian musician. He signed with WEA and released an album, The News in 1989. Llewellyn was the keyboard player in Icehouse from 1991 until 2004.

His single "Pick You Up" was engineered by Guy Gray and he was nomination for the 1989 ARIA Music Award for Engineer of the Year for that single and three other releases.

Discography

Albums

Singles

Awards and nominations

ARIA Music Awards
The ARIA Music Awards are a set of annual ceremonies presented by Australian Recording Industry Association (ARIA), which recognise excellence, innovation, and achievement across all genres of the music of Australia. They commenced in 1987. 

! 
|-
| 1989 || Guy Gray for "Pick You Up" || ARIA Award for Engineer of the Year ||  || 
|-

References

Living people
Australian musicians
Year of birth missing (living people)